Prasophyllum tunbridgense, commonly known as the Tunbridge leek orchid, is a species of orchid endemic to Tasmania. It has a single tubular, bright green leaf and up to twenty five relatively large, green to light greenish-brown flowers with white petals and a large white labellum.

Description
The edges of the upturned part of the labellum have irregularly crinkled edges and there is a greenish-yellow, fleshy, raised callus in its centre and extending just past the bend. Flowering occurs in October and early November, more prolifically after earlier fires.

Taxonomy and naming
Prasophyllum tunbridgense was first formally described in 1998 by David Jones from a specimen collected in a nature reserve near Tunbridge and the description was published in Australian Orchid Research. The specific epithet (tunbridgense) refers to the type locality.

Distribution and habitat
The Tunbridge leek orchid is only known from six populations near Tunbridge and Campbell Town where it grows in grassland.

Conservation
The population of P. tunbridgense has been estimated as about 140. It is classed as "Endangered" under the Tasmanian Threatened Species Protection Act 1995 and under the Commonwealth Government Environment Protection and Biodiversity Conservation Act 1999 (EPBC) Act. The main threats to the population are land clearing, grazing by sheep, and by its small population size.

References

External links 
 

tunbridgense
Flora of Tasmania
Endemic orchids of Australia
Plants described in 1998